Wang Zhiwen (born 1962 in  Chenghai, Guangdong) is a Chinese micro-calligrapher.  He is the only Chinese micro-calligraphist in the world. Wang started his career about in the 1990s. Because his specialty is so rare, he must also make all the special brushes and ink himself. Wang once spent 7 years to write 350 thousand traditional Chinese characters on an arrow container which is only 85 centimeters tall and 29 meters long in diameter. His art was  shown at the World Expo in Shanghai.

References

External links
 Official Site

Living people
1962 births
People's Republic of China calligraphers
People from Chenghai
Artists from Guangdong